Sorin Răducu Mogoșanu (born 22 November 1992) is a Romanian professional footballer who plays as a goalkeeper for Liga I side FC U Craiova 1948. In his career, Mogoșanu also played for teams such as FC Drobeta-Turnu Severin, FC Caracal, FC Olt Slatina or CSO Filiași, among others. In Romania, Mogoșanu played only for football clubs based in Oltenia region, but he also had a spell in Germany, where he played for lower division club SV Hebertsfelden.

Honours
FC U Craiova
Liga II: 2020–21
Liga III: 2019–20
Liga IV – Dolj County: 2017–18
Cupa României – Dolj County: 2017–18

References

External links
 

1992 births
Living people
Sportspeople from Craiova
Romanian footballers
Association football goalkeepers
Liga I players
Liga II players
Liga III players
FC Drobeta-Turnu Severin players
FC Caracal (2004) players
FC Olt Slatina players
FC U Craiova 1948 players
Romanian expatriate footballers
Expatriate footballers in Germany
Romanian expatriate sportspeople in Germany